Dom Teodoro de Faria GOIH (Funchal, August 24, 1930), is Madeiran Catholic clergyman who was Bishop of Funchal between 1982-2007 and is currently Emeritus Bishop of the same diocese.

Career 
Teodoro was ordained priest on September 22, 1956. Ten years after his ordination he would be appointed Vice-Rector of the Pontifical Portuguese College in Rome in 1966 and later Rector of the Pontifical College and the Church of Saint Anthony of the Portuguese.

He would later become a member of the Apostolic Union of the Clergy and the Center for Sindonology he gave conferences, retreats and courses in various parts of the world. He was the representative of Portugal in Rome in the Secretariats for Ecumenism, Emigration, Tourism and Pilgrimages.

He was Secretary of the Cardinal Patriarch of Lisbon, António II, in the conclaves that elected Popes John Paul I and John Paul II.

He would later be consecrated  in Rome on May 16, 1982, in the Church of Saint Anthony in Campo Marzio as Bishop of Funchal in 1982, in the early years of Madeira's political autonomy, and effectively taking office on May 16 that year. He took possession of the Diocese on May 30 of the same year.

In 1986 was appointed President of the Portuguese Episcopal Commission for Migration and Tourism, and two years after he was elected member of the Pontifical Commission for Migrants and Itinerant People, having participated in Rome in several Congresses.

In his capacity as Bishop he was a representative of the Portuguese Episcopal Conference at Commission of the Bishops' Conferences of the European Community.

During his term as Bishop of Funchal, Bishop de Faria hosted the visit of Pope John Paul II to the islands of Madeira and Porto Santo, which were under his ecclesiastical jurisdiction.

In 2006 he submits his resignation from office to Pope Benedict XVI, due to having achieved his age limit in office.

Child Abuse Policies 
During his tenure has Bishop of Funchal, Teodoro publicly defended, as was accused of pressuring Portuguese judicial authorities, Father Frederico Cunha who ended up being convicted to 13 years in prison for child abuse by the Court of Santa Cruz.

At the time, Bishop de Faria, claimed that the Father Frederico Cunha was being prosecuted based on unfounded grounds.

Frederico Cunha, although convicted, would end up escaping on his first probation period, in 1998,  by taking a car from the Portuguese mainland, he was serving sentence in a prison in the mainland, to Madrid, and from there to Brazil, where he lives to day.

Teodoro de Faria, has committed himself to silence on this case since the conviction of Father Frederico Cunha. In September 2020, de Faria still believed in the innocence of Cunha.

Emeritus Bishop of Funchal 
As Emeritus Bishop of Funchal, Teodoro de Faria has led a low profile presence in Madeiran society, having public appeared solely in major religious and academics events on the island.

Nevertheless, he has criticized the current bishop, Dom António Carrilho, regarding the need for parish restructuring in the Diocese of Funchal. Teodoro de Faria considers that in Madeira, "some parishes are only called parishes due to pity", arguing that there are places where the parish priest has two or three parishes, and every year there are one or two baptized, some of which are ceremonies of faithful living abroad, but choose their land to celebrate the sacraments.

Given the above, he considered that the principle established by Bishop Fra' David de Sousa, who was Bishop of Funchal between 1957 and 1965, should be reintroduced in the Diocese, i.e. there should be a parish per, at least, two thousand people. Teodoro argues that parish restructuring is vital, specially after the great emigration waves to Venezuela and to South Africa.

On 28 July 2018 he was co-consecrator of José Tolentino Calaça de Mendonça, Head Librarian and Head Archivist of the Holy Roman Church.

Honours

National Orders 

  Grand-Officer of the Order of Prince Henry, 6 June 2008

Other honours 

On the end of April 2017, Funchal's City Hall, led by then Mayor Miguel Albuquerque, decided that to honor Bishop Teodoro by naming a 430m avenue after his name, Avenida Dom Teodoro Faria, in São Martinho.

References 

20th-century Roman Catholic bishops in Portugal
1930 births
Living people
People from Funchal
21st-century Roman Catholic bishops in Portugal